David Ferrer was the defending champion, and he successfully defended his title by defeating Stanislas Wawrinka in the final 6–4, 3–6, 6–1.

Seeds

Draw

Finals

Top half

Bottom half

Qualifying

Seeds

Qualifiers

Lucky losers
  Marco Trungelliti

Draw

First qualifier

Second qualifier

Third qualifier

Fourth qualifier

External links
 Main draw
 Qualifying draw

Copa Claro - Singles
2013 Singles